Marsh Concrete Rainbow Arch Bridge is a reinforced concrete through arch bridge over the Little Cottonwood River in Cambria Township, Minnesota, United States. The bridge is listed on the National Register of Historic Places. The bridge no longer carries traffic, which has since been shifted to another bridge to the east.

The bridge was designed by James Barney Marsh and built in 1911, the same year in which he filed a patent for his rainbow arch design. His design features two arched ribs, one on either side of the roadway, rising above the deck. The deck is suspended from the arches by vertical risers. Drivers see the rainbow arch crowns on each side, similar to crossing a pony truss bridge. The bridge over the Little Cottonwood River is one of the oldest Marsh rainbow arches in the country. Unfortunately, as traffic flow increased and farm machinery got larger, many of Marsh's rainbow arch designs became obsolete, since they could not be widened. There are only half a dozen Marsh rainbow arch bridges remaining in Minnesota.

References

1911 establishments in Minnesota
Bridges completed in 1911
Buildings and structures in Blue Earth County, Minnesota
Former road bridges in Minnesota
National Register of Historic Places in Blue Earth County, Minnesota
Road bridges on the National Register of Historic Places in Minnesota
Through arch bridges in the United States
Transportation in Blue Earth County, Minnesota
Concrete bridges in the United States
Tied arch bridges in the United States